Elena Garcia Armada (b. 1971 Valladolid, Spain) is a Spanish researcher, roboticist and business founder who has conducted extensive research on prosthetic exoskeletons to aid people in walking.

Early life and education
Elena Garcia Armada was born in Valladolid, Spain in 1971. She received a doctorate in robotic engineering in 2002 from the Polytechnic University of Madrid and began a career in industry-orientated robotics. She began work at the Center for Automation and Robotics, (CAR) CSIC-UPM, as a postdoctoral research fellow. She Received her PHD in “Optimizing the speed and stability of legged robots in natural environments”. She completed her training at the Leg Laboratory of the Massachusetts Institute of Technology.

Daniela
In 2009, Garcia met Daniela, a six-year-old girl who had become tetraplegic as a result of a traffic accident. Garcia became determined to engineer paediatric robotic exoskeletons, which were not available in medicine at this time.  The goal of these exoskeletons was to provide gait assistance to contribute to the rehabilitation of injured children or children suffering from degenerative neuromuscular diseases.

Career
Garcia continues to work for CAR as a  Tenured senior scientist within the Centre for Automation and Robotics (CSIC-UPM). She leads her own research group creating artificial legs and quadrupeds developing versatile artificial muscles.The aim of the groups research is to improve the performance of legged robots, including, active compliance in foot-ground interaction, developing new actuators, improving dynamic stability, and designing and controlling agile quadrupeds and lower-limb exoskeletons for mobility aid.

Garcia cofounded Marsi Bionics in 2013 as a spin-off of CAR. It builds adjustable paediatric exoskeletons that incorporate small motors to mimic muscle movements and provide the person with the strength to walk.

During her Career, Garcia has published 80 international scientific articles and one book on legged locomotion. Additionally, Garcia is a member of the Editorial board of the IEEE International Conference on Robotics and Automation.

Research and publications

Books

Magazines and magazine articles

References

External links

1971 births
Living people
Women roboticists
People from Valladolid
Polytechnic University of Madrid alumni